The 1986 season was the Hawthorn Football Club's 62nd season in the Victorian Football League and 85th overall.

Fixture

Premiership season

Finals series

Ladder

References

Hawthorn Football Club seasons